Massilia Sound System is a reggae band formed in Marseille, France, in 1984. They developed a Provençal hybrid version of reggae, rub-a-dub and raggamuffin, with lyrics in the French and Occitan languages, sometimes referred to as trobamuffin (from the Occitan word trobador and the musical style raggamuffin), though they have also performed in Portuguese and Italian. They incorporate many rhythms, beats and samples from the local tradition or other musical colleagues, and their lyrics indicate a profound parochialism for Marseille and the south of France in general.

Massilia Sound System re-popularized the city of Marseille in the 1990s, in conjunction with the success of Olympique de Marseille, the local soccer club. Along with that, empowered an entire generation of young Marseillaise with a positive identity, proud of their city and their capacity to embrace different cultural traditions.

Intra-regional links were formed with other groups, such as Claude Sicre's Fabulous Trobadors in Toulouse, Les Nux Vomica in Nice, and other reggae/ ragga groups using the culture and language of the region.

Their recent albums incorporate more rock sounds, with deepening explorations into world music, such as the use of tabla, and make further incursions into drum and bass and hip-hop.

On 18 July 2008, Lux B, one of the members of Massilia Sound System, died at the age of 47 after battling illness for some time.

Discography
 Rude et souple (demo cassette)
 Vive le PIIM (demo cassette)
 Parla Patois (1992)
 Chourmo (1993)
 Commando Fada (1995)
 On met le òai partout (live album) 1996)
 Aïolliwood (1997)
 Marseille London Experience (1999)
 3968 CR 13 (2000)
 Occitanista (2002)
 Massilia fait tourner (live album) (2004)
 Òai e Libertat (2007)
 Massilia (2014)
 Sale Caractère (2021)

External links 
 Official Site (in French and Occitan)
 MySpace page
 Papet Jali interview with CNN, 2006

French reggae musical groups
Musical groups from Marseille
Musical groups established in 1984